Yarali-ye Sofla (also Romanized as Yār‘alī-ye Soflá) is a village in Nurali Rural District, in the Central District of Delfan County, Lorestan Province, Iran. At the 2006 census, its population was 21, in 4 families.

References 

Towns and villages in Delfan County